Carter County is a county located in the U.S. state of Kentucky. As of the 2020 census, the population was 26,627. Its county seat is Grayson. Carter County is in the Huntington-Ashland, WV-KY-OH Metropolitan Statistical Area. It is home to Carter Caves State Resort Park.

History
Carter County was formed on February 9, 1838, from portions of Greenup County and Lawrence County. It was named after Colonel William Grayson Carter, a Kentucky state Senator. The county seat is named for his uncle, Robert Grayson.

The original courthouse was rebuilt in 1907.

Geography

Adjacent counties
 Greenup County  (northeast)
 Boyd County  (east)
 Lawrence County  (southeast)
 Elliott County  (south)
 Rowan County  (southwest)
 Lewis County  (northwest)

Demographics

As of the census of 2000, there were 26,889 people, 10,342 households, and 7,746 families residing in the county. The racial makeup of the county was 99.02% White, 0.13% Black or African American, 0.25% Native American, 0.11% Asian, 0.08% from other races, and 0.41% from two or more races.  0.59% of the population were Hispanic or Latino of any race.

There were 10,342 households, out of which 33.50% had children under the age of 18 living with them, 60.50% were married couples living together, 10.70% had a female householder with no husband present, and 25.10% were non-families. 22.30% of all households were made up of individuals, and 9.80% had someone living alone who was 65 years of age or older.  The average household size was 2.54 and the average family size was 2.95.

In the county, the population was spread out, with 24.50% under the age of 18, 10.80% from 18 to 24, 28.40% from 25 to 44, 23.80% from 45 to 64, and 12.50% who were 65 years of age or older.  The median age was 36 years. For every 100 females there were 95.90 males.  For every 100 females age 18 and over, there were 93.30 males.

The median income for a household in the county was $26,427, and the median income for a family was $31,278. Males had a median income of $28,690 versus $20,554 for females. The per capita income for the county was $13,442.  About 19.20% of families and 22.30% of the population were below the poverty line, including 28.90% of those under age 18 and 21.30% of those age 65 or over.

Politics

Education
 Carter County School District
 Kentucky Christian University, located in Grayson

Alcohol sales
Carter County is a moist county, meaning that sale of alcohol in the county is prohibited except in certain areas as voted on by the residents of the area, with at least one area approving full retail alcohol sales. In the case of Carter County, alcohol sales are only permitted as follows:
 At a single approved winery in the Iron Hill precinct, near the unincorporated community of Carter City.
 Within the city of Grayson after a vote on June 11, 2013, approved full retail alcohol sales within the city limits by a vote of 511 in favor of alcohol sales to 393 against.
 Within the city of Olive Hill after a vote on March 10, 2014, approved full retail alcohol sales within the city limits by a vote of 257 in favor of alcohol sales to 206 against.

Communities

Cities
 Grayson (county seat)
 Olive Hill

Unincorporated communities

 Access
 Beech Grove
 Beetle
 Boone Furnace
 Carter
 Davy Run
 Denton
 Grahn
 Hitchins
 Mount Savage
 Norton Branch
 Rooney
 Rush (part)
 Smiths Creek
 Soldier
 Straight Creek
 Willard

Transportation
Carter County is accessible by U.S. Route 60 and Interstate 64. Until 2010, the city of Olive Hill owned an airport.

See also
 National Register of Historic Places listings in Carter County, Kentucky

References

External links

 The Kentucky Highlands Project

 
1838 establishments in Kentucky
Populated places established in 1838